The Junior Defenders is a 2007 direct-to-video comedy-fantasy film from Warner Bros. starring Ally Sheedy, Brian O'Halloran, Justin Henry, and Jason David Frank.

Plot
With a fanbase that rivaled Star Treks, The Junior Defenders was one of the top TV hits of the late '70s. 25 years following the show's sudden cancellation, a crazed fan named Norman is still obsessed with the show. In his mania, Norman treks across the country in a stolen Winnebago, kidnapping the four washed-up former child stars, Jill, Mitch, Jimmy, and Tommy, from his beloved childhood program. The kidnappings spark a national media frenzy. Once in Hollywood, Norman takes over a soundstage and forces the cast at gunpoint to act in his brand-new episode of The Junior Defenders.

Cast
 John Waters as Narrator
 Ally Sheedy as Jill Fields
 Brian O'Halloran as Mitch Stone
 Justin Henry as Jimmy Fletcher
 Jason David Frank as Tommy Keen, who shares the same first name with Tommy Oliver from Power Rangers
 Fred Hazelton as Norman Nields

The film features cameo appearances by Pauly Shore, Florence Henderson, Peter Tork, Michael Dukakis, and Kevin Smith.

Production
Originally titled Groupies, the film's principal photography occurred in February–March 1997.

References

External links
 
 
 
 

2007 direct-to-video films
2007 films
2000s fantasy comedy films
American fantasy comedy films
2007 independent films
Films set in the 1970s
Films set in 2003
American independent films
Warner Bros. films
2007 comedy films
2000s English-language films
2000s American films